Rose Jang is an acclaimed Korean-American pop opera singer who is well known for singing operatic arias, musical and classic pop songs (3.5 octave range to high F). She is the first Korean to release an album comprising operatic arias as well as hit musical songs. She has 6 CD albums, one live concert DVD and many singles including the recent Nella Fantasia. Jang is PR ambassador for many organizations including the Korean Tourism Office and UNESCO of Korea.  She recently became PR ambassador for the National Committee for Jeju-do Island one of the world's New7Wonders of Nature.  She performed with the Rose Pops Orchestra at Lincoln Center for the Performing Arts Alice Tully Hall on November 9, 2011 to promote Jeju Island as one of the New 7 Wonders of Nature. with South Korean President Lee Myung-bak's blessing for a great show.  She currently records in New York City, Seoul, and London.

Jang has been hailed as a heroine for Korean-Americans.  Jang has been credited for one of the reasons why Jeju Island was voted to be a New 7 Wonder of Nature.  She promoted Jeju Island heavily as she campaigned the New 7 Wonders of Nature with her Lincoln Center concert.  The concert was promoted on Yahoo, The Wall Street Journal, Marketwatch, ABC-TV, New York Daily News, and Reuters.

Early life 

Jang was born in Princeton, New Jersey, USA.  She is the daughter of Daniel Jang who has a doctorate from Princeton University and is also a graduate of Kyunggi High School and Seoul National University. Her mother, Carolyn Bok Jang, immigrated to New York City from South Korea and worked for world-renowned painter Salvatore Dali and was a model for Ford Models. Her grandfather, Dr. Young-Chul Jang was a president of Choongbuk National University.  At the young age of four, Rose was admitted into The Manhattan School of Music's children's program. There, she received lessons in music for the piano, violin and voice.  She also served as concertmaster for her Bridgewater-Raritan High School. The high school's symphony orchestra consisted of 120 members.  She performed the violin as part of the New Jersey Youth Symphony.  She performed with the New Jersey Youth Symphony at Carnegie Hall at the age of 17.  She is a graduate of Smith College.  She has also studied at Goldsmiths College in London.  Jang is a member of the Princeton Korean Church which is a Christian Presbyterian Church located in Princeton, New Jersey.  She is fluent in English, Korean, and French.

Awards and achievements 
Jang has won a number of awards for her accomplishments in music including the award for "Outstanding Vocalist" in the "Classical" category at the South Korean Entertainment Awards. Awards were given to sixty of Korea's leading music, film, and performing arts icons. Jang was also awarded "Most Successful Artist" of 2009 at the Seoul Success Awards. She received the "special" award at Asia's largest music festival "The Asia Song Festival".  Jang has performed at major events including the inaugural ceremony of South Korean President Lee Myung Bak and an event celebrating U.N. Secretary General Ban Ki-Moon.  She also has performed at Pridefest in Milwaukee, Wisconsin  where she performed alongside legendary R&B vocalist Patti LaBelle who said that Rose has "an absolutely beautiful voice and is an amazing performer.

Jang reached number one on the domestic and international music charts with her performance of the song "Memory" from the Cats (musical) topping versions by both Celine Dion and Barbra Streisand.

Jang has broken the record for most weeks at #1 on the Korean classical chart with her rendition of "You Raise Me Up" from the "Songs of Hope" series.

Jang in 2008 performed at the inauguration of former South Korean president Lee-Myung Bak.

In June 2010 Jang was chosen as one of Korea's "10 Most Shining Stars" by Arirang Television Network. Arirang (TV network), a popular network in Asia, aired a documentary of her life in music that was broadcast in 170 countries around the world reaching an audience of 150 million people. The documentary Koreans on the World Stage aired on December 29, 2012. Jang was also featured on Korea's SBS hit TV show Star King where she performed as a "Special Guest."

Jang is a former spokes-model for Lancome cosmetics and was featured in Elle, Vogue, and Marie Claire magazines.

In September 2012, Rose was featured in Korea's Cosmopolitan Magazine as the "10 Most Powerful Korean Women in New York."

Jang has performed the Dutch national anthem for s friendly match between South Korea and The Netherlands, as well as the World Cup primary between Uzbekistan, Turkmenistan and South Korea singing the national anthem for the guest countries. In October 2008 she was a guest speaker at the World Knowledge Forum in Seoul. She has also performed at the All Star Game for the Korea Baseball Organization.

Ambassador career 
Jang is currently working on a project that will allow her to promote Korean culture globally. As an official Ambassador for Korean Tourism (the only female vocalist to hold this position), she plans to adapt traditional folk songs for English listeners. She then plans to perform traditional Korean folk songs in English at concert halls around the world. On February 24, 2010, she debuted these rearranged Korean folk songs at the Seoul Arts Center.

She has also performed during the 2010 South Africa World Cup in Johannesburg in front many of the world's top FIFA presidents. In addition, she has performed for many FIFA events and has even been praised by FIFA chairman, Sepp Blatter and FIFA Vice President, Mong Joon Jung. During the 2010 World Cup in South Africa, Jang performed in Johannesburg for six of the top twenty four representatives of FIFA in order to promote the bidding for the World Cup to take place in Korea in the year 2022 in which she performed solo alongside world-renowned soprano Sumi Jo. She has also performed at the World Cup in 2006 as well as many friendly and World Cup qualifying games.

Jang has performed for world leaders including the president of Turkmenistan and the secretary general of the United Nations, Ban Ki-moon. In addition, Jang often performed musical pieces at events for the former South Korean president Lee Myung-bak.

Jang has performed with autistic children for her solo concerts and many of her solo concerts are in conjunction with South Korea's largest autistic foundation "Eden Welfare Foundation".  She has performed with clarinet player Woojin Kim for 2 of her Seoul Art Center concerts.

Recent performances 

She recently performed a solo concert at Sejong Center for the Performing Arts on September 28, 2010.  Jang performed the national anthem on the final day of the Formula One Grand Prix of South Korea on October 24. She performed at the G20 Summit in Seoul.  In October and November Jang completed a seven-city tour of South Korea.

Upon finishing a Symphony tour in South Korea this past December, Rose performed a "sold out" solo Christmas concert at Princeton University's Richardson Auditorium which Buddy Graham called "one of the world's acoustically "great" concert halls".

She has also completed another 2011 Seoul Arts Center solo concert on Feb. 17 2011 entitled "Nouveaux Classics" where she debuted rearranged 1980s "New Wave" hits and original theme songs from popular films.

Jang is set to perform at the IAAF World Championships in Athletics in August.
Jang performed at the Asia MBA Awards Gala on September 9.

Jang performed with the Rose Pops Orchestra at Lincoln Center on November 9, 2011.

On May 5, 2012 Rose Jang sang at the last home game of the season Charlton vs Hartlepool, to celebrate Charlton Athletic as League One winners for the 2011–12 season and their promotion to the Championship.

On May 15, 2012 Jang performed at a benefit at Wembley Stadium.

Jang is in London recording a new benefit single.

In 2012, Jang sang the British National Anthem at The Horse of the Year Show in England which was aired live on Sky TV.

On September 25, 2013, Jang performed for the Korea Society in NYC at the Plaza for the 60th Anniversary of the US Korea Alliance and the Korean War Armistice. She performed in front of distinguished members of the United Nations and for those nations who assisted South Korea in their win against North Korea, Russia and China.

On June 29, 2014, Rose performed a benefit at the Calvary Church with tenor Yang Ji who was a former Met Opera choir member.

On October 15, 2015, Jang performed at the Olympic Stadium in Seoul, Korea celebrating Koreans living abroad. The President of Korea was in attendance. Jang represented the USA.

On December 8, 2015, Jang performed a full Xmas concert for the Korean American Association of New York.

On January 25, 2017, Rose performed at the Inauguration of the 45th President of the United States of America.

On March 26, 2017, Jang performed in Washington, D.C. for an annual benefit in front of an audience of highly distinguished guests including both senators and governors from Maryland and Virginia.

On October 25, 2017, Rose performed for the Korean American Alliance Association in Seoul. She performed the national anthems of both South Korea and the United States of America for the likes of many world leaders and dignitaries.

On December 5, 2017, Rose performed for the opening of Hong Kong’s most prized events in Kowloon.

On February 25, 2018, Rose performed for the PyongChang Olympics touring throughout South Korea.

In May 2019, Rose performed at Carnegie Hall's famed Issac Stern Auditorium.

In September, 2019, Rose performed for a benefit concert in Washington, DC.

References

External links 
 
 http://www.edenwelfare.org

Living people
1979 births
People from Princeton, New Jersey
Smith College alumni
Alumni of Goldsmiths, University of London
21st-century American singers
21st-century American women singers